The Missouri Pacific Depot of Prescott, Arkansas is located at 300 West 1st Street North.  It is a -story red brick building, with a breezeway dividing it into two sections.  One section continues to be reserved for railroad storage, while the other, the former passenger ticketing and waiting area, has been adapted for use by the local chamber of commerce and as a local history museum.  It was built in 1911-12 by the Prescott and Northwestern Railroad, which interconnected with the Missouri-Pacific Railroad at Prescott.  The line had passenger service until 1945.

The building is now known as the Nevada County Depot and Museum. Exhibits include area settlers, railroads, and military items from World War I, World War II, the American Legion, National Guard of the United States, 1941 U.S. Army maneuvers in Prescott.

The depot building was listed on the National Register of Historic Places in 1978.

See also
National Register of Historic Places listings in Nevada County, Arkansas

References

External links
 Nevada County Depot and Museum - official site

Railway stations on the National Register of Historic Places in Arkansas
Railway stations in the United States opened in 1912
Museums in Nevada County, Arkansas
History museums in Arkansas
1912 establishments in Arkansas
National Register of Historic Places in Nevada County, Arkansas
Prescott
Former railway stations in Arkansas
Transportation in Nevada County, Arkansas
Transportation museums in Arkansas
Prescott, Arkansas